The 2023 Nigerian Senate elections in Gombe State will be held on 25 February 2023, to elect the 3 federal Senators from Gombe State, one from each of the state's three senatorial districts. The elections will coincide with the 2023 presidential election, as well as other elections to the Senate and elections to the House of Representatives; with state elections being held two weeks later. Primaries were held between 4 April and 9 June 2022.

Background
In the previous Senate elections, only one incumbent senator was returned: in the Central district, Mohammed Danjuma Goje (APC) was re-elected but Usman Bayero Nafada (PDP-North) retired to unsuccessfully run for governor and Senator Joshua Lidani (PDP-South) lost renomination. In the Central district, Goje held his seat with 69% of the vote; both of the open seats were also won by APC as Sa'idu Ahmed Alkali won the North district with 62% and Amos Bulus Kilawangs gained the South seat with 53% of the vote. These results were a part of a large swing to the Gombe APC as every House of Representatives seat was won by the party, it won a majority in the House of Assembly, and Buhari won the state in the presidential election.

Overview

Summary

Gombe Central 

The Gombe Central Senatorial District covers the local government areas of Akko and Yamaltu/Deba. The incumbent Mohammed Danjuma Goje (APC) was re-elected with 68.8% of the vote in 2019 and is seeking re-election.

Primary elections

All Progressives Congress 

The year ahead of the APC primary was categorized by a party crisis as the state APC was split between supporters of Goje on one side and the other side supporting incumbent Governor Muhammad Inuwa Yahaya. The crisis forced party officials to take a side and even became violent when an attack on Goje's convoy killed 5 people in November 2021. Although the feud could have impacted Goje's renomination effort, Goje and Yahaya reconciled in January 2022. The primary, held at the Gombe State University of Science and Technology in Kumo, ended in Goje's renomination over two other candidates in a landslide.

People's Democratic Party 

On the primary date, Abubakar Aliyu—a CPC gubernatorial candidate in 2011—was nominated in a landslide over Muhammadu Aliyu Baba.

General election

Results

Gombe North 

The Gombe North Senatorial District covers the local government areas of Dukku, Funakaye, Gombe, Kwami, and Nafada. The incumbent Sa'idu Ahmed Alkali (APC), who was elected with 62.0% of the vote in 2019, is seeking re-election.

Primary elections

All Progressives Congress 

On the primary date, three candidates contested an indirect primary that ended with Alkali winning renomination after results showed him defeating Bala Bello Tinka by a significant margin. The primary was held in Malam Sidi, the headquarters of Kwami LGA.

People's Democratic Party 

Initially there were three screened candidates for the primary (former Governor and 2019 nominee Ibrahim Hassan Dankwambo, former Senator Usman Bayero Nafada, and Abdulkadir Hamma Saleh); however, Nafada and Saleh withdrew in favour of Dankwambo on the date of the primary. Due to these withdrawals, Dankwambo was nominated via affirmation.

Campaign
As a rematch of the 2019 election between Alkali and Dankwambo, pundits attempted to identify the changes in the four year interim period. In December 2022, The Nation reporting stated that Dankwambo was in the better position as memory of his unpopular governorship had faded and the PDP appeared to be rising in the district. A few weeks later, Daily Trust analysis from later that month contended that the race was still too close to predict. In the days before the election, the Wikki Times revealed that the Alkali campaign was bribing indigent voters with sewing, grinding, and noodle-making machines.

General election

Results

Gombe South 

The Gombe South Senatorial District covers the local government areas of Balanga, Billiri, Kaltungo, and Shongom; it is largely coterminous with the Southern Gombe region, noted for its relative ethnic diversity and Christian majority in a state that is mainly ethnic Hausa-Fulani and majority Muslim. Incumbent Amos Bulus Kilawangs (APC) was elected with 52.9% of the vote in 2019 and sought re-election but lost the APC nomination.

Primary elections

All Progressives Congress 

The primary, held at the Government Lodge in Billiri, was initially rancour-free until partway through the final count when election officials changed rooms and security prevented the public from entering the new collation room. About 70 minutes after voting had finished, state government appointee Sani Sabo announced former Senator Joshua Lidani as the victor over Kilawangs and Bilyaminu Babadidi. Supporters of both Kilawangs and Babadidi rejected the results and tension in the venue rose to the point of requiring police intervention. Within a few days of the primary, Kilawangs formally challenged the results in a case claiming that he had been winning before election officials changed rooms and the room change was clear manipulation while also noting that Sabo was not even an actual primary official. For Babadidi's part, he filed a lawsuit against Lidani at the Federal High Court in Gombe.

People's Democratic Party 

The initial primary, held in Billiri, resulted in victory for Anthony Siyako Yaro—a businessman and banker—over former MHR Binta Bello by a narrow 2 vote margin. However, Bello formally rejected the results due to 'dead and disqualified delegates appearing on the delegates' list' and improperly gender unbalanced delegates' list from some LGA parties. Bello's challenge was successful with the state PDP cancelling the original primary and ordering a rerun for 8 June; the rerun was also won by Yaro, who received around 80% of the total vote.

Campaign
As the most electorally competitive Senate seat in the state, focus shifted to the southern district immediately after the primaries. A few months later, The Nation analysis gave the edge to Yaro due to the controversial APC primary and widespread Tangale anger at the APC in the wake of the 2021 Mai Tangale crisis.

General election

Results

See also 
 2023 Nigerian Senate election
 2023 Nigerian elections

References 

Gombe State senatorial elections
2023 Gombe State elections
Gombe State Senate elections